The Rolls-Royce ACCEL (Accelerating the Electrification of Flight) is an electric aircraft demonstrator developed by Rolls-Royce plc.

Development

Designed at Gloucestershire Airport, the project is partly funded by the UK government and involves partners such as electric motor and controller manufacturer YASA Limited and aviation start-up Electroflight.

The team aimed to reach the 1931 Schneider Trophy speed, which was won by a R-R-powered Supermarine S.6B, reaching .

On 15 September 2021, Rolls-Royce announced the aircraft, named "Spirit of Innovation", had successfully completed its first flight, flying from MoD Boscombe Down for fifteen minutes.
The speeds achieved were accepted as world records for electric aircraft by the Fédération Aéronautique Internationale in January 2022.

Design

The  span aircraft is powered by three high power density electric motors driving a single three-blade propeller spinning at 2,400 RPM, designed and manufactured by YASA. The 750 volt, 216 KWh battery has 6,480 cells, with cork insulation and active cooling. Battery output power will be  continuous, reaching  at maximum power.. It is designed to have the highest energy density for an aircraft, and should allow a  range.

The maximum take-off weight of the NXT is 1,200 kg. Rolls-Royce intend the battery, motors and control equipment in a production system to weigh the same as the regular engine and fuel tank in a conventional aircraft, but the battery pack alone in the Spirit of Innovation currently weighs 1350 kg.

References

External links
 

Rolls-Royce aircraft
Electric aircraft
Proposed aircraft
Low-wing aircraft
Aircraft first flown in 2021